William C. E. Thomas (November 21, 1818August 13, 1876) was an American publisher, clerk, and politician.  He was the first Mayor of Green Bay, Wisconsin.

Biography
Born in Muncy, Pennsylvania, he received an education at the Milton Academy at Milton, Pennsylvania.  While at Milton, he apprenticed in a printing shop and learned the printing trade.

In 1839, he moved west, settling at Galena, Illinois, where he worked for the Galena Daily Gazette for nearly ten years.  After a period of bad health, he moved north to Green Bay, in the new state of Wisconsin.  There, he partnered with Edwin R. Wadsworth and Cyrus Eames in a tannery business.  He worked here until 1851, when he became a general merchant.

He became one of the more popular citizens at Green Bay, and, when the city received its official charter in 1854, he was elected their first Mayor, serving one year.

When the first American Express office in Green Bay was opened in 1857, Thomas was hired as the agent for that office and worked in that role through 1871.  Concurrent to this, he was city clerk, elected by the city council in 1858, and held that role until 1871.

In 1871, he was appointed postmaster for Green Bay by President Ulysses S. Grant for a term to begin in 1872.  He held this office until his death in 1876.

Personal life and family
Thomas married Jane H. Eames.  Together they had two sons and a daughter, though only one son, William, survived infancy.

He suffered from declining health for two years, beginning in 1874, and was confined to his home for the last two months of his life.  After a month of significant suffering, he died on August 13, 1876.

His former home at 318 North Van Buren Street stood until 2015, when it was replaced by a set of row houses.

Electoral history

| colspan="6" style="text-align:center;background-color: #e9e9e9;"| General Election, May 1, 1854

References

External links
 

|-

1818 births
1876 deaths
Mayors of Green Bay, Wisconsin
19th-century American politicians
People from Lycoming County, Pennsylvania